Dan Thiessen (October 19, 1922–November 17, 2012) was an American politician who served in the Kansas House of Representatives and Kansas State Senate.

Thiessen worked as a farmer and rancher in Independence, Kansas. He was elected to the Kansas House in 1968 and served six terms there; in 1980, he was elected to the Kansas Senate and served an additional three terms. In 1982, Thiessen was the Republican nominee for Lieutenant Governor of Kansas, but the ticket was defeated and Thiessen remained in the Senate.

References

1922 births
2012 deaths
Republican Party Kansas state senators
Republican Party members of the Kansas House of Representatives
20th-century American politicians
People from Independence, Kansas
Farmers from Kansas
Ranchers from Kansas